is a train station in Chippubetsu, Uryū District, Hokkaidō, Japan.

Lines
Hokkaido Railway Company
Rumoi Main Line

Adjacent stations

Stations of Hokkaido Railway Company
Railway stations in Hokkaido Prefecture
Railway stations in Japan opened in 1987